Iron Man is a 1951 American film noir drama sport film directed by Joseph Pevney and starring Jeff Chandler, Evelyn Keyes and Stephen McNally. The film features an early appearance by Rock Hudson playing a competing boxer. The film is a remake of a film produced two decades earlier by director Tod Browning, also titled Iron Man.

Plot
Chandler plays a coal miner who is encouraged by his gambler brother (Stephen McNally) to become a boxer. The problem is when he boxes he is consumed by a murderous rage.

Cast
 Jeff Chandler as Coke Mason
 Evelyn Keyes as Rose Warren Mason
 Stephen McNally as George Mason
 Rock Hudson as Tommy "Speed" O'Keefe aka Kosco
 Joyce Holden as 'Tiny' Ford – Photographer
 Jim Backus as Max Watkins
 James Arness as Alex Mallick (as Jim Arness)
 Steve Martin as Joe Savella

Background
Jeff Chandler trained as a boxer to play the role. "It's my chance to step right up there in a class with Kirk Douglas and Bob Ryan", said Chandler. "And that's pretty fast company."

Filming started 3 January 1951.

To promote the film, Jeff Chandler went two rounds with Jersey Joe Walcott at Polo Grounds in front of 25,000 spectators.

Reception

Critical response
When the film was released, the staff at  The New York Times gave the film a mixed review. They wrote, "... this story of a fighter, scared and defeated by his own killer instinct, is merely standard for the course. The cast, director and scenarist are professional and take their assignments seriously, but they are not creating a champion in their class. One is reminded of such noted predecessors as Champion but Iron Man is not of that blue-blooded company ... It is not the portrayals, however, that make the film less than memorable. The bouts are exciting enough, but the punches, which are fairly hard and straight, are telegraphed."

Rock Hudson's appearance in the film attracted favorable publicity.

See also
 List of American films of 1951

References

External links
 
 
 
 

1951 films
1951 drama films
American drama films
American black-and-white films
American boxing films
Film noir
Films based on American novels
Films based on works by W. R. Burnett
Films directed by Joseph Pevney
Universal Pictures films
Remakes of American films
1950s English-language films
1950s American films